Kyat Gu is a 2018 Burmese drama film, directed by Lu Min starring Lu Min, Myint Myat, Kyaw Htet Aung, Htun Eaindra Bo and Eaindra Kyaw Zin. The film was produced by Aung Tine Kyaw Film Production and premiered in Myanmar on November 16, 2018.

Cast
Lu Min as Shwe Daung
Myint Myat as Htaw Gyi
Kyaw Htet Aung as Kyaung Saya
Htun Eaindra Bo as Mya Sein
Eaindra Kyaw Zin as Shwe Hmyin

References

2018 films
2010s Burmese-language films
Burmese drama films
Films shot in Myanmar
2018 drama films